Didier Bence (born August 14, 1987) is a Canadian professional heavyweight boxer from Laval, Quebec.

He is best known for becoming a Canadian amateur boxing champion as a teenager and winning bronze at the 2007 Pan American Games, defeating two-time US champion Mike Wilson twice in the process due to controversial stoppage at the 1:03 mark of the third round.

Being the most favorable participant of Pan American Games, walked away due to severe injury in his semifinal against Colombian Oscar Rivas and lost by walkover which earned him bronze. This injury didn't stop him to pursue his dream in commonwealth gamesJoseph Parker and turning professional in 2011.

Amateur career

Bence, who was coached by Claude Bélanger, is 6 feet 1 inches tall and weighs 230 pounds, relying on extraordinary speed and power as a heavyweight.
Bence started boxing at the age of 14 and won the Canadian junior championships in 2005 and 2006 and the senior title at super heavyweight in 2007 till 2010.
He upset Mike Wilson on points in the PanAm qualifier (in Argentina) and faced him again in a bout at the main event in Rio de Janeiro which he won again this time by controversial stoppage at the 1:03 mark of the third round. Wilson had led by an 8-5 margin at the time of the stoppage. 
Due to an injury, he couldn't participate in the semifinal against Colombian Oscar Rivas and lost by walkover which earned him bronze. This injury also kept him from participating in the 2007 World Amateur Boxing Championships.
In the middle of 2007 his record was 30-7.

At the end of 2007 he defended his national title in a tournament valid for 2008.
At the "Copa Independencia" tournament in early 2008 he reached the final but lost to PanAm Champ Robert Alfonso.
Jeux de la francophone in 2009 lost by decision in the finals claiming a silver medal.

Continental championship lost against Jorge Quiñonez in the finals against (Ecuador) 2010 taking the silver medal.

He finished the year featuring in the 2010 Commonwealth Games in New Delhi. The then 23 years old in a fiery contest, charged in the third and final round when it appeared winning the fight. Parker was down 7:5 on points when he landed a decisive right hand to Bence's head with one minute 15 seconds remaining. It knocked the Canadian down and effectively ended the fight as Joseph Parker registered the last nine points 14:7.Joseph Parker then advanced to the quarterfinals, losing to Tariq Abdul Haqq.

At the second Olympic qualifier he lost 3:4 to Michael Hunter jr. and didn't make it to Beijing.
End of his amateur career his record was 46-13.

Professional 
He turned pro in 2011 and beat American amateur stars Joey Dawejko and Jonte Willis and KOd undefeated countryman Eric Barrak (7-0) but was KOd by unknown Eric Martel Bahoeli (9-3) in 2013 and outpointed by Sylvera Louis	(5-3) in 2014. It is believed that his failure to advance in his professional career was due to a misfortune, losing his boxing coach Claude Bélanger in 2012.

Professional record 

|- style="margin:0.5em auto; font-size:95%;"
| style="text-align:center;" colspan="8"|10 Wins (3 knockouts, 7 decisions), 3 Loss, 0 Draw
|-  style="text-align:center; margin:0.5em auto; font-size:95%; background:#e3e3e3;"
|  style="border-style:none none solid solid; "|Res.
|  style="border-style:none none solid solid; "|Record
|  style="border-style:none none solid solid; "|Opponent
|  style="border-style:none none solid solid; "|Type
|  style="border-style:none none solid solid; "|Rd., Time
|  style="border-style:none none solid solid; "|Date
|  style="border-style:none none solid solid; "|Location
|  style="border-style:none none solid solid; "|Notes
|- align=center
|Loss ||10-3||align=left| Avery Gibson
|||||
|align=left| 	
|align=left|
|- align=center
|Loss ||10-2||align=left| Sylvera Louis
|||||
|align=left| 
|align=left|Lost vacant Canada Cruiserweight title.
|- align=center
|Win ||10-1||align=left| Rob Nichols
|||||
|align=left| 
|align=left|
|- align=center
|Loss ||9-1||align=left| Eric Martel Bahoeli
|||||
|align=left| 
|align=left|
|- align=center
|Win ||9-0||align=left| Eric Barrak
|||||
|align=left| 
|align=left|
|- align=center
|Win ||8-0||align=left| Jonte Willis 
|||||
|align=left| 
|align=left|
|- align=center
|Win ||7-0|| align=left|  Joey Dawejko
||| || 
|align=left| 
|align=left|
|- align=center
|Win ||6-0||align=left| Harold Sconiers
||| || 
|align=left| 
|align=left|
|- align=center
|Win ||5-0|| align=left| Stephane Tessier
| ||  || 
|align=left| 
|align=left|
|- align=center
|Win ||4-0|| align=left| Sandy Pembroke
| ||  || 
|align=left| 
|align=left|
|- align=center
|Win ||3-0|| align=left| Pavels Dolgovs
| ||   || 
|align=left| 
|align=left|
|- align=center
|Win ||2-0|| align=left| Dwayne Storey
|||   ||   
|align=left| 
|align=left|
|- align=center
|Win ||1-0||align=left| Leonard Collier
|||  ||   
|align=left| 
|align=left|Bence's pro debut.
|- align=center

External links
Pro record
Canadians 2008

References

1987 births
Living people
Heavyweight boxers
Super-heavyweight boxers
Sportspeople from Laval, Quebec
Canadian male boxers
Pan American Games bronze medalists for Canada
Pan American Games medalists in boxing
Boxers at the 2007 Pan American Games
Black Canadian boxers
Medalists at the 2007 Pan American Games